Elissa Landi (born Elisabeth Marie Christine Kühnelt; December 6, 1904 – October 21, 1948) was an Austrian-American actress born in Venice, who was popular as a performer in Hollywood films of the 1920s and 1930s. She was noted for her alleged aristocratic bearing.

Biography
Landi was born Elisabeth Marie Christine Kühnelt in Venice, Italy, to Austrian military officer Richard Kühnelt and his wife Caroline.
She was raised in the village of Kleinhart in Lower Austria near Vienna until the divorce of her parents. Later on she was educated in England. From 1928 to 1936, she was married to John Cecil Lawrence, and from 1943 to 1948 to Curtis Kinney Thomas (1905–2002).

Landi's first ambition was to be an author. She wrote her first novel at the age of twenty, and returned to writing during lulls in her acting career. She debuted on stage in Dandy Dick (1923). She joined the Oxford Repertory Company at an early age, and appeared in many successful British and American stage productions. In 1926 she starred in Dorothy Brandon's Blind Alley in the West End.

During the 1920s she appeared in British, French, and German films before traveling to the United States to appear in a Broadway production of A Farewell to Arms (1930). Her other Broadway credits included Empress of Destiny (1938), Apology (1943), and Dark Hammock (1944).

She was signed to a contract by Fox Film Corporation (later 20th Century Fox) in 1931. She was paired successfully with some of the major leading men, including David Manners, Charles Farrell, Warner Baxter, and Ronald Colman, in romantic dramas such as Body and Soul (1931, which also featured Humphrey Bogart).

In 1931, she starred in the Fox feature The Yellow Ticket along with a young Laurence Olivier, Lionel Barrymore, and Boris Karloff. Raoul Walsh directed. The film was based on Michael Morton's 1914 play and was about a young Jewish girl who obtains a prostitute's passport during a period when Jews were not allowed such freedom so that she can travel in Czarist Russia to visit her sick father.

Fox loaned her to Paramount to play Mercia, the female lead in Cecil B. DeMille's 1932 film adaptation of the play of the same name. DeMille said he chose her for the role because "[t]here is the depth of the ages in her eyes, today in her body and tomorrow in her spirit."

She starred in the box office hit The Count of Monte Cristo (1934) with Robert Donat.

Her contract with Fox was abruptly cancelled in 1936 when she refused a particular role. Metro-Goldwyn-Mayer signed her, and after a couple of romantic dramas, she played the cousin of Myrna Loy in the very popular After the Thin Man (1936). She retired from acting in 1943, after making only two more films.

Landi became a naturalized U.S. citizen in 1943 and dedicated herself to writing, producing six novels and a series of poems. She had published her first novel as early as age nineteen. She continued writing novels at the height of her movie fame and for the rest of her short life.

She died from cancer in Kingston, New York, at age 43 and was buried at Oak Hill Cemetery in Newburyport, Massachusetts.

Elissa Landi has a star on the Hollywood Walk of Fame for her contributions to Motion Pictures, at 1611 Vine Street.

Filmography

Radio appearances

References

External links

Photographs of Elissa Landi

1904 births
1948 deaths
American film actresses
Austrian film actresses
Austrian silent film actresses
Austrian emigrants to the United States
Deaths from cancer in New York (state)
20th Century Studios contract players
20th-century American actresses
20th-century Austrian actresses
Naturalized citizens of the United States
Austro-Hungarian expatriates in Italy
Austrian expatriates in the United Kingdom